Impossible Monsters is a horror anthology edited by actress and musician Kasey Lansdale. It was published as both a limited edition and a trade hardcover by Subterranean Press in late July 2013. The limited edition had already sold out prior to publication. The Lansdale name is legendary in the horror field. Now Kasey Lansdale follows in her father Joe Lansdale's footsteps with this anthology of monstrously innovative stories. The twelve creatures that stalk the pages of Impossible Monsters spring from the twisted imaginations of a dozen of today’s most noted authors.

Table of contents
"Introduction" by Kasey Lansdale
"Blue Amber" by David J. Schow
"Click-Clack the Rattlelebag" by Neil Gaiman
"Cavity Creeps" by Cody Goodfellow
"The Glitter of the Crowns" by Charlaine Harris
"Doll’s Eyes" by Tim Bryant
"Bloaters" by Neal Barrett, Jr.
"Detritus" by Chet Williamson
"Monster" by Anne Perry
"Orange Lake" by Al Sarrantonio
"Nathan"—Selina Rosen
"Blood Moccasins" by Bradley Denton
"The Case of the Angry Traveler" (A Dana Roberts Adventure)" by Joe R. Lansdale

External links
Editor's Official Website
Publisher's Website

References

2013 anthologies
American anthologies
Horror anthologies
Subterranean Press books